Nechaq (also Romanized as Nacheq; also known as Nachagh, Najāq, Nehchaq, and Nicha) is a village in Dizmar-e Markazi Rural District, Kharvana District, Varzaqan County, East Azerbaijan Province, Iran. At the 2006 census, its population was 339, in 80 families.

References 

Towns and villages in Varzaqan County